The International Science Youth Forum (ISYF) is a science enrichment programme for students from all over the globe. It is hosted at Hwa Chong Institution (HCI), under the Students' Science Research Club (SSRC), and co-organised by Nanyang Technological University (NTU), Institute of Advanced Studies (IAS), bringing students from across Asia-Pacific together to network and dialogue, with Nobel laureates coming down to share their experiences in the scientific field.

In 2010, a record five Nobel laureates were involved in the panel discussion, one of the key parts of the forum. In 2016, it brought together over 120 students and educators from all over the world.

Forum 
First organized in 2009 by students from Hwa Chong Institution and co-organized by Nanyang Technological University, Institute of Advanced Studies (IAS), the forum has been held every year since 2009.

Themes

Eminent Scientists over the Years

References 

Youth science